Genesis is the debut studio album by American rapper Domo Genesis. It was released on March 25, 2016, through Odd Future and distributed by Columbia Records. The album contains features from Wiz Khalifa, Juicy J, Tyler, the Creator, Anderson .Paak, Tay Walker, Dash, King Chip, Mac Miller and JMSN, among others.

Genesis received generally positive reviews from critics, debuting at number 110 on the US Billboard 200. It was supported by two singles: "Dapper" and "Go (Gas)".

Background
On November 13, 2013, Domo stated in a MellowHigh interview with Hodgy Beats and Left Brain that he is working on his debut studio album. On April 3, 2014, Domo stated that he plans to release his debut studio album before 2015. On February 17, 2016, Domo confirmed that the album is completed and is turned in for mixing.

Release and promotion 
On March 10, 2016, the pre-order, track listing and release date were revealed. The music video for the album's lead single "Dapper" was released on March 24, 2016 on the official Odd Future YouTube channel. It currently has over three million views, as of January 2017. On July 19, 2016, Domo performed "Dapper" on Jimmy Kimmel Live! with Anderson .Paak.

Singles 
On March 10, 2016, the lead single, "Dapper" featuring Anderson .Paak was released. It was produced by Garcia Bros. On March 17, 2016, the second and final single "Go (Gas)" featuring Wiz Khalifa, Juicy J and Tyler, the Creator, was released. It was also produced by Tyler, the Creator.

Critical reception

Genesis was met with generally positive reviews. At Metacritic, which assigns a normalized rating out of 100 to reviews from professional publications, the album received an average score of 70, based on six reviews.

David Jeffries of AllMusic said, "Domo Genesis still talks about weed and weirdness, and sometimes with a star-studded guest list, as the killer "Go (Gas)" features Wiz Khalifa, Juicy J, and Tyler, The Creator. Mac Miller figures into the great "Coming Back", but the bits about Domo's family, his autistic brother, and his own search for self make this a meatier album than expected." Keith Nelson Jr. of HipHopDX said, "It's the subtle sequencing--deliberate to show his progression--that elevates the project from merely a delinquent to being the tale of a reformed man." Sheldon Pearce of Pitchfork said, "Sometimes the hooks on Genesis get wonky, there are portions of the record that feel unfinished (like the second half of "Wanderer"), and every now and then Domo will sneak in a groaner. But for the most part, Genesis is a revelation."

Ebyan Abdigir of Exclaim! said, "Domo's Genesis is a step in the right direction, but he's walking to his destination, and not anywhere near where he needs to be just yet." Brian Tabb of Pretty Much Amazing said, "The sparks of great art are there, but the brain behind the creation lays dormant. Time will tell where Domo goes, and honestly Genesis isn't a bad beginning."

Track listing

Notes
 signifies an additional producer
 "Awkward Groove" and "One Below" feature additional vocals by Carmel Echols and Samantha Nelson
 "Wanderer" features additional vocals by Cam O'bi
 "Dapper" features additional vocals by Carmel Echols, Chaz Mason and Samantha Nelson
 "All Night" features additional vocals by Kevin McCall

Sample credits
 "Awkward Groove" contains a sample from "13 Gangbanglul", performed by Frank Dukes and written by Adam Feeney.
 "Wanderer" contains a sample from "Those Days", performed and written by Robert Glasper.
 "Coming Back" contains a sample from "I'm Coming Back", performed by Lalah Hathaway and written by Gary Taylor.
 "Dapper" contains a sample from "Voyager", performed by Dexter Wansel and written by Wansel, Herbert Smith, Derrick Graves, Lemuel Harper, Steven Goldstein, Billy Johnson and George Howard.

Charts

References

2016 albums
Albums produced by Left Brain